Venkatesan is both a given name and a surname. Notable people with the name include:

Given name
Venkatesan Devarajan (born 1973), Indian boxer
Venkatesan Guruswami (born 1976), Indian computer scientist
 Loganatha Venkatesan (1974–2001), Indian foreign worker and murderer executed in Singapore

Surname
L. Venkatesan, Indian politician
Madhavi Venkatesan, American economist
P. R. S. Venkatesan, Indian politician
Rani Venkatesan, Indian politician
Rose Venkatesan (born 1980), Indian television personality
S. Venkatesan (born 1970), Indian writer